Donath-Landsteiner may refer to:
Donath–Landsteiner hemolytic anemia
Donath-Landsteiner syndrome: an autoimmune hemolytic anemia featured by complement-mediated intravascular hemolysis after cold exposure